Charles Berkeley may refer to:

Charles Berkeley, 2nd Viscount Fitzhardinge (1599–1668), English peer
Charles Berkeley, 1st Earl of Falmouth (bef. 1636–1665), English politician and courtier, son of the above
Charles Berkeley, 2nd Earl of Berkeley (1649–1710), English peer and politician
Charles Lennox Grenville Berkeley (1809–1896), Member of Parliament for Cheltenham
Charles Berkeley, 3rd Baron FitzHardinge (1830–1916), British Liberal politician
Charles Berkeley (bobsleigh) (born 1976), American bobsledder

See also
Charles Barkley (disambiguation)